Newburgh Hamilton (1691–1761) was an Irish author and librettist.

He was born in County Tyrone, Ireland (now Northern Ireland) and entered Trinity College, Dublin, in 1708, aged sixteen, but (as was common in those days) he left without obtaining a degree. He is known to have been George Frederick Handel's librettist for three works: Alexander's Feast (1736), Samson (1743) and the Occasional Oratorio (1746). In writing the libretto for Handel's Samson (1743), he followed John Milton's Samson Agonistes rather than creating it from the story found in the Book of Judges. His comedy The Petticoat-Plotter was presented at Drury Lane on 5 June 1712 and The Doating Lovers was premièred at Lincoln's Inn Fields Theatre on 23 June 1715. 

His work is discussed in Terence Tobin, Plays by Scots 1660-1800 (University of Iowa Press, 1974) and by Adrienne Scullion in Bill Findlay, A History of Scottish Theatre (Edinburgh: Polygon, 1998)

See also 
 Alexander's Feast (Dryden)

1691 births
1761 deaths
People from County Tyrone
Scottish librettists
Irish writers
18th-century Irish writers